Saturn-Apollo 2 (SA-2) was the second flight of the Saturn I launch vehicle, the first flight of Project Highwater, and was part of the American Apollo program. The rocket was launched on April 25, 1962, from Cape Canaveral, Florida.

History 

Launch preparation for the mission began at Cape Canaveral on February 27, 1962, with the arrival of the second Saturn I launch vehicle. The only significant change made to the vehicle from the previous SA-1 flight was the addition of extra baffles in the propellant tanks to mitigate fuel sloshing. While no serious delays were encountered, there were several minor problems reported.

A leak was detected between the liquid oxygen dome and injector for the #4 H-1 rocket engine; while attempts were made to fix the problem, it was eventually decided to launch without replacing the engine. Minor problems were found in the guidance subsystem and service structure operations, damaged strain gauges were found in a liquid oxygen stud and truss member, and a manhole cover on the dummy Centaur (S-V-D) third stage had to be replaced. Problems arose with two of the fueling computers, but each was repaired. Three hydraulic systems were also listed as potential problems.

Despite the issues encountered during flight preparation, none required the target launch date of April 25 to be pushed back.

Flight 

Saturn-Apollo 2 was launched at 14:00:34 UTC on April 25, 1962, from Launch Complex 34. The only hold in the countdown sequence was for 30 minutes due to a vessel which entered the flight safety zone  down range. The rocket carried  of propellant, about 83% of its maximum capacity.

Objectives 

The objectives of SA-2 were much the same as those of SA-1 in that it was primarily a test of the Saturn I rocket and the new H-1 engines. Specifically, its goals were to prove propulsion performance and mission adequacy, vehicle structural design and aerodynamic characteristics, guidance and control systems, and launch facility and ground support equipment. NASA declared all objectives as successful. Additionally, the fuel sloshing issue from SA-1 was minimized.

A second objective of both this mission and SA-3 was Project Highwater, the intentional release of ballast water from the second and third stages which allowed scientists to investigate the nature of Earth's ionosphere, as well as noctilucent clouds and the behavior of ice in space.

Stage two contained  of water, and stage three contained . When the terminate command was sent to the rocket, dynamite charges split the second stage longitudinally, instantly releasing its water load. Primacord charges created several  holes in the third stage, releasing its water over a period of several seconds.

Cameras on the ground immediately recorded the water cloud, and personnel at a ground station began to observe it about four to five seconds after release. The cloud produced lightning-like effects, which Dr. Wernher von Braun described as "probably the first synthetic thunderstorm ever generated in space." Project Highwater on this flight was also declared a success.

References

External links 

Apollo program
1962 in spaceflight
Test spaceflights
Spacecraft launched by Saturn rockets